Luvian Veto (abbreviated LuVe) is a sports club from Luvia, Finland. The club was formed in 1930 and currently has sections covering football, skiing, athletics and fitness. The men's football first team currently plays in the Nelonen (Fourth Division). Their home ground is at the Tasala Park.

Background

LuVe have always competed in the lower divisions of the Finnish football league.  However, since the club re-entered the league in 2003 they have made steady progress over the last 8 seasons gaining respective promotions from the Vitonen (Fifth Division) in 2004 and Nelonen (Fourth Division) in 2009.  Playing in the Kolmonen (Third Division) in the 2010 season represents a new challenge for the club.

Season to season

Club Structure

Luvian Veto run a large number of teams including 2 men's team, 1 ladies team, 2 men's veterans team and 8 boys teams.  The club also run futsal teams in the winter months..

2010 season

LuVe Men's Team are competing in the Kolmonen (Third Division) section administered by the Satakunta SPL.  This is the fourth highest tier in the Finnish football system.  In 2009 LuVe finished in 2nd place in the Nelonen (Fourth Division).

LuVe /2 are participating in the Vitonen (Fifth Division) section administered by the Satakunta SPL.

References and sources
Official Website
Finnish Wikipedia
Suomen Cup
 Luvian Veto Facebook

Footnotes

Football clubs in Finland
1930 establishments in Finland